Adolphe Steg (27 January 1925 – 11 April 2021) was a Czechoslovak-born French urologist and Holocaust survivor.

Early life
Steg was born on 27 January 1925 in Czechoslovakia into a family of Orthodox Jews. His father, Mordechai Steg, born on 19 April 1895 in Bistra, Austria-Hungary, took his family to Paris in 1928. Mordechai had three children with his wife, Feige: Adolphe, Bitia, and Rachel. The family settled in the 12th arrondissement.

Steg's father, Mordechai, who had gone by the name of Martin to avoid identification as a Jew, was interned at the Beaune-la-Rolande internment camp. He was then subsequently deported to Auschwitz as part of Convoy No. 5 on 28 June 1942. Martin survived deportation and later returned to Paris. Adolphe, a student at the Lycée Voltaire, bore a yellow badge as required for Jews living in German-occupied territory. However, his teacher, Mr. Binon, had his class read De la tolérance by Montesquieu. He escaped the Vel' d'Hiv Roundup on 16 July 1942 with false papers, and, thanks to a smuggler, was able to cross the demarcation line into the Zone libre. He was then sent to Sarlat to continue his education, where he joined the 3rd Battalion of Armagnac of the French Forces of the Interior.

Medical career and leadership in the Jewish community
He succeeded Aboulker as head of the urology department at the hospital, holding the role from 1976 to 1990. He was elected President of the French Society for Urology in 1986, served as President of the French Association of Urology from 1987 to 1989, and was Secretary General of the European Association of Urology from 1984 to 1992. He became a member of the Académie nationale de chirurgie in 1981 and joined the Académie Nationale de Médecine on 24 October 2000. He operated on President François Mitterrand's prostate cancer from 1992 to 1994.

In addition to his medical career, Steg served numerous responsibilities in the Jewish community. He was President of the Paris section of the Union des étudiants juifs de France ("Union of French Jewish students") and vice-president of the World Union of Jewish Students. While at the Alliance Israélite Universelle, Steg oversaw renovations to the school library renovations, the creation of a new College of Jewish Studies, and a growing network between Israel and France. He became Honorary President once his term was finished in 2011. He served on the honorary committee of the Fondation France-Israël and was a member of the board of directors of the Fondation pour la Mémoire de la Shoah.

Other functions held by Steg include membership on France's Economic, Social and Environmental Council from 1979 to 1983 and again from 1995 to 2010, membership on the Commission nationale consultative des droits de l'homme starting in 2002, and membership on the Collège de la Haute autorité from 2007 to 2011.

Personal life
Steg was married to Gilberte Nissim, a gynecologist and former member of the French Resistance. His sister, Bitia (1926-2020), lived in Jerusalem. His other sister, Rachel (1923–2009) lived in Haifa. His elder brother, Henri (1922–2016), lived in Paris and was an active member of the French Resistance and the International League Against Racism and Anti-Semitism.

Adolphe Steg died on 12 April 2021 at the age of 96.

Distinctions
Grand Officer of the Legion of Honour (2000)
Grand Cross of the Ordre national du Mérite (2006)
Doctor honoris causa of the Hebrew University of Jerusalem (2001)

References

1925 births
2021 deaths
People from Michalovce District
Jews in the French resistance
French urologists
Grand Officiers of the Légion d'honneur
Grand Cross of the Ordre national du Mérite
Holocaust survivors
Czechoslovak emigrants to France
Czechoslovak Jews